Shattock is a surname. Notable people with the surname include:

Aaron Shattock (born 1980), Australian rules footballer
Gordon Shattock (1928—2010), British veterinarian
Paul Shattock, British autism researcher and scientific consultant
Robin Shattock (born 1963), British immunologist
Samuel George Shattock (1852–1924), British pathologist
Tyler Shattock (born 1990), Canadian ice hockey player